Anthony Philip Gilson Hughes, Lord Hughes of Ombersley  (born 11 August 1948 in St Albans, Hertfordshire) is a former English judge of the Supreme Court of the United Kingdom. He was previously a Lord Justice of Appeal and Vice-President of the Criminal Division from 2009, following the retirement of Lord Justice Latham, to 9 April 2013.

Education and early life 
He was born to Patrick and Patricia Hughes. He was educated at Tettenhall College and obtained a BA in law from Van Mildert College, University of Durham. He was made an honorary fellow of the college in 2015.

Career 
He was called to the Bar (Inner Temple) in 1970. He was a Crown Court Recorder from 1985 to 1997, being Head of Chambers until 1997 of No.1 Fountain Court Chambers, Birmingham. He was knighted in 1997. He was appointed a Queen's Counsel in 1990, and a judge of the High Court of Justice, Family Division, from 1997 to 2003. He served as Presiding Judge on the Midland circuit from 2000 to 2003, and transferred to the Queen's Bench Division from 2004 to 2006.

On 9 April 2013, he was appointed a Justice of the Supreme Court of the United Kingdom. By Royal Warrant, all members of the Supreme Court, even if they do not hold a peerage, are entitled to the judicial courtesy title "Lord" for life. Hughes was granted the judicial courtesy title Lord Hughes of Ombersley, referencing Ombersley in Worcestershire. He retired from office on 11 August 2018, upon reaching the age of 70.

Personal life 
In 1972, he married Susan March. They have a son and a daughter.

Selected cases
The Public Prosecution Service v William Elliott and Robert McKee [2013] UKSC 32

See also
List of Lord Justices of Appeal
List of Durham University people

References

External links
Information about Court of Appeal

1948 births
Living people
People educated at Tettenhall College
Alumni of Van Mildert College, Durham
20th-century English judges
People from St Albans
Knights Bachelor
Members of the Privy Council of the United Kingdom
Family Division judges
20th-century King's Counsel
Judges of the Supreme Court of the United Kingdom
21st-century English judges